St. Elmo is a novel by American author Augusta Jane Evans published in 1866. Featuring the sexual tension between the protagonist St. Elmo, a cynical man, and the heroine Edna Earl, a beautiful and devout girl, the novel became one of the most popular novels of the 19th century. The novel sold a million copies within four months of its publication.

Augusta Jane Evans (May 8, 1835 – May 9, 1909) finished her celebrated novel at El Dorado, a historical home in Columbus, Georgia. In 1878, the home was purchased by Captain and Mrs. James J. Slade who changed its name to St. Elmo in honor of the novel which it had inspired.

In popular culture
The novel St. Elmo was frequently adapted for both the stage and screen. It inspired the naming of towns, hotels, steamboats, and a cigar brand. The book's heroine Edna Earl became the namesake of Eudora Welty's heroine (Edna Earle Ponder) in The Ponder Heart published in 1954. 

The novel also inspired a parody of itself called St. Twel'mo, or the Cuneiform Cyclopedist of Chattanooga (1867) by Charles Henry Webb.

A film and website on Augusta Evans Wilson entitled The Passion of Miss Augusta was produced by Alabama filmmaker Robert Clem and aired on public television in 2016, the 150th anniversary of the publication of St. Elmo.

Film adaptations
The novel has inspired the production of a number of films. These include in chronological order:
 St. Elmo (1910 Thanhouser film), a silent film
 St. Elmo (1910 Vitagraph film), a silent film
 St. Elmo (1914 film), a silent film
 St. Elmo (1923 American film), a silent film
 St. Elmo (1923 British film), a silent film

References

External links
 St. Elmo at the Internet Archive
 St. Elmo at Project Gutenberg

1866 American novels
American novels adapted into films